Mugguru Maratilu  is a 1946 Telugu-language historical drama film produced and directed by Ghantasala Balaramayya under the Pratibha Productions banner. It stars Akkineni Nageswara Rao, C. H. Narayana Rao, Bezawada Rajaratnam and Kannamba , with music composed by Ogirala Ramachandra Rao. The film was recorded as a Super Hit at the box office and established Akkineni Nageswara Rao in the Telugu film industry.

Plot
Badegao is ruled by Maratha ruler Siddhoji (Govindarajula Subba Rao). Since he had no children, he brings up his elder brother's three sons – Somoji (C.H.Narayana Rao), Subandhi (G. Narayana Rao) and Firoji (Akkineni Nageswara Rao) like his own sons. All the respects due to the King and his consort are performed first to them. At this, Siddhoji's wife Rukkubai (Kannamba) who is jealous of the boys, sows seeds of hatred against them in her husband's mind. She plans to spoil the marriage of Firoji with Raghubai (T. G. Kamala Devi). Siddhoji banishes the three princes from Badegao and sends them to rule Pathikonda. Rukkubai plots with Diwanji to kill the three princes by inviting them to the palace to discuss the marriage proposal. However, Raghubai helps them escape. At the same time, Siddhoji declares war on Pathikonda and his army burned the fort. Somoji's wife Anthumbai (Kumari) escapes with her son Tule Rao. Siddhoji chases her. In the sword fight that ensues, Anthumbai emerges victorious. Since Pathikonda is out of bounds for her, she takes shelter at Gollapalle. Somoji and his brothers also reach there. They possess the hereditary riches after Firoji valiantly undertakes a journey to please their deity Yellamma. The news reaches Rukkubai and she employs the dreaded Mari to eliminate the brothers and they succeed in killing Somoji and capturing Subandhi. Anthumbai provokes the people to revolt against Siddhoji and she leads the war. In an unexpected turn of events, Firoji becomes the king of a neighbouring country and he too invades Badegao with a huge army. Siddhoji is killed in the war. Rukkubai repents for her act. Firoji marries Raghubai.

Cast
 Akkineni Nageswara Rao as  Firoji
 C. H. Narayana Rao as Somoji
 G. Narayana Rao as Subandhi
 Bezawada Rajaratnam
 Govindarajula Subba Rao as Maharaja Siddhoji
 Kasturi Siva Rao as Timoji
 Kannamba as Maharani Rukmibai
 T. G. Kamala Devi as Raghubai
 Kumari as Anthumbai

Crew
 Art: S. V. S. Rama Rao
 Choreography: Vedantam Raghavayya
 Story - Dialogues: Balijepalli Lakshmikantham
 Lyrics: Tapi Dharma Rao, Prayaga Narasimha Sastry
 Playback: Akkineni, Kannamba, T. G. Kamala Devi, Kasturi Shiva Rao, Bezawada Rajaratnam, Prayaga Narasimha Sastry
 Music: Ogirala Ramachandra Rao
 Editing: P. Sridhar
 Cinematography: G. D. Joshi
 Producer - Director: Ghantasala Balaramayya
 Banner: Pratibha Productions
 Release Date: 1 June 1946

Soundtrack

Music composed by Ogirala Ramachandra Rao. Lyrics were written by Tapi Dharma Rao. Music released on Audio Company.

Box office
 The film ran for 100 days in four centers; Vijayawada, Guntur, Rajahmundry and Nellore in Andhra Pradesh.

References

External links
 Mugguru Maratilu at IMDb.

1946 films
Indian black-and-white films
1940s Telugu-language films
Indian drama films
1946 drama films
Films scored by Ogirala Ramachandra Rao